The Zbigniew Cybulski Award (Polish: Nagroda im. Zbyszka Cybulskiego) is a Polish annual film award given to best young Polish actors. It was established in 1969 on the initiative of Wiesława Czapińska and named to commemorate Zbigniew Cybulski who is widely considered one of the greatest Polish actors of the second half of the 20th century. It is among the most prominent awards in Polish cinema and the past winners include some of the most popular and critically acclaimed Polish actors. It was continuously awarded by the film magazine Ekran from 1969 to 1995 and after a ten-year hiatus it was reactivated in 2005 by the Kino Foundation. In 2008, the foundation published a book Być jak Cybulski?, which is devoted to all the past recipients of the award.

List of winners 
2020/2021 - Magdalena Koleśnik
2019 - Bartosz Bielenia
2017 - Dawid Ogrodnik; Special Award: Julia Kijowska
2016 - Marta Nieradkiewicz
2014/2015 - Agnieszka Żulewska
2013 - Piotr Głowacki; Special Award: Agnieszka Grochowska
2012 - Marcin Kowalczyk
2011 - Magdalena Popławska; Audience Award: Jakub Gierszał
2010 - Mateusz Kościukiewicz; Audience Award: Wojciech Zieliński
2009 - Eryk Lubos; Audience Award: Agata Buzek; Special Award: Bogusław Linda, Joanna Szczepkowska
2008 - Maciej Stuhr
2007 - Sonia Bohosiewicz; Audience Award: Marcin Brzozowski
2006 - Kinga Preis; Audience Award: Tomasz Kot
2005 - Marcin Dorociński; Kino Magazine Award: Maja Ostaszewska; Audience Award: Borys Szyc
1995 - Dorota Segda, Marek Bukowski
1994 - Maria Seweryn, Rafał Olbrychski
1993 - Katarzyna Skrzynecka, Rafał Królikowski
1992 - Anna Majcher, Artur Żmijewski 
1990 - Zbigniew Zamachowski
1989 - Adrianna Biedrzyńska 
1988 - Maria Gładkowska, Piotr Siwkiewicz 
1987 - Maria Pakulnis, Edward Żentara 
1986 - Małgorzata Pieczyńska, Jan Jankowski
1985 - Marek Wysocki
1984 - Hanna Mikuć, Michał Juszczakiewicz
1983 - Laura Łącz, Piotr Bajor 
1982 - no award (Martial law in Poland)
1981 - no award (Martial law in Poland)
1980 - Krzysztof Majchrzak 
1979 - Marek Kondrat 
1978 - Krystyna Janda 
1977 - Gabriela Kownacka
1976 - Małgorzata Potocka 
1975 - Maciej Góraj 
1974 - Franciszek Trzeciak 
1973 - Jadwiga Jankowska-Cieślak 
1972 - Maja Komorowska
1971 - Olgierd Łukaszewicz
1970 - Marian Opania
1969 - Daniel Olbrychski

Source:

See also 
Polish cinema
Gdynia Film Festival
Warsaw Film Festival

References 

Polish film awards
1969 establishments in Poland
Awards established in 1969